Maciej Bernadowski (born 29 April 1989) is a Polish ice dancer. His former partners include Milena Szymczyk, Natalia Sinkiewicz, and Anastasia Gavrylovych. He and Szymczyk were coached by his mother, Bożena Bernadowska, in their hometown Łódź. Bernadowski currently skates with Alexandra Zvorigina, with whom he is a three-time (2011–2013) Polish national champion.

His elder brother, Filip Bernadowski, also competed in ice dance.

Programs 
(with Zvorigina)

Results

With Zvorigina

With Gavrylovych

With Sinkiewicz

With Szymczyk

References

External links 

 
 
 

1989 births
Living people
Polish male ice dancers
Sportspeople from Łódź